Isherwood may refer to:

People

Annie Isherwood (1862–1906), Anglican nun, founder of the Community of the Resurrection of Our Lord in Grahamstown, South Africa
Benjamin F. Isherwood (1822–1915), U.S. ship's engineer and United States Navy admiral
Brian Isherwood (born 1946), New Zealand cricketer
Charles Isherwood, theater critic
Christopher Isherwood (1904–1986), English novelist
Geof Isherwood (born 1960), Canadian painter and comics artist
George Isherwood (born 1889), English rugby union player, part of the first official British Isles team in 1910
James Lawrence Isherwood (1917–1989), English artist
Jean Isherwood (1911–2006), Australian painter
Joseph Isherwood (1870–1937), British naval architect
Mark Isherwood (politician) (born 1959), Welsh politician
Nicholas Isherwood, bass singer
Ray Isherwood (1938–2014), Australian cricket umpire
Emma Taylor-Isherwood (born 1987), Canadian actress
Sally Taylor-Isherwood (born 1990), Canadian actress

Ships

USS Isherwood (DD-284), a U.S. Navy destroyer in commission from 1919 to 1930
USS Isherwood (DD-520), a U.S. Navy destroyer in commission from 1943 to 1961
USNS Benjamin Isherwood (T-AO-191), a U.S. Navy oiler launched in 1988 that was never completed and is in reserve.